The Munster Junior Club Hurling Championship (known for sponsorship reasons as the AIB Munster GAA Hurling Junior Club Championship) is an annual hurling competition organised by the Munster Council of the Gaelic Athletic Association and contested by the five champion junior clubs and one champion intermediate club in the province of Munster in Ireland. It is the most prestigious competition for junior clubs in Munster hurling.

The Munster Junior Club Championship was introduced in 2001. In its current format, the championship begins in late October or early November and is usually played over a four-week period. The six participating club teams compete in a straight knockout competition that culminates with the Munster final for the two remaining teams. The winner of the Munster Junior Championship, as well as being presented with the Rody Nealon Cup, qualifies for the subsequent All-Ireland Club Championship.

The competition has been won by 19 teams, however, no team has ever won the championship on more than one occasion. Cork clubs have accumulated the highest number of victories with 14 wins. Cork side Ballygiblin are the reigning champions, having beaten Skeheenarinky from Tipperary by 2-14 to 1-9 in the 2021 final.

Format

Overview
The Munster Championship is a single elimination tournament. Each team is afforded only one defeat before being eliminated from the championship. Pairings for matches are drawn at random and there is no seeding.

Each match is played as a single leg. If a match is drawn there is a period of extra time, however, if both sides are still level at the end of extra time a replay takes place and so on until a winner is found.

Competition format
Quarter-final: Four teams contest this round. The two winning teams advances directly to the semi-final stage. The two losing teams are eliminated from the championship.

Semi-finals: Four teams contest this round. The two winning teams advance directly to the final. The two losing teams are eliminated from the championship.

Final: The final is contested by the two semi-final winners.

Teams

Qualification

Trophy and medals
At the end of the Munster final, the winning team is presented with a trophy. The Rody Nealon Cup is held by the winning team until the following year's final. Traditionally, the presentation is made at a special rostrum in the stand where GAA and other dignitaries and special guests view the match.

The cup is decorated with ribbons in the colours of the winning team. During the game the cup actually has both teams' sets of ribbons attached and the runners-up ribbons are removed before the presentation. The winning captain accepts the cup on behalf of his team before giving a short speech. Individual members of the winning team then have an opportunity to come to the rostrum to lift the cup.

The cup is named after Rody Nealon. He was an All-Ireland medal winner with Tipperary in 1925 before later serving as chairman and secretary of the Burgess club at different times, while he was also a member of the Tipperary County Board and the Munster Council.

In accordance with GAA rules, the Munster Council awards a set of 24 gold medals to the winners of the Munster final.

Sponsorship
Since 2001, the Munster Championship has been sponsored. The sponsor has usually been able to determine the championship's sponsorship name.

List of Finals

Roll of Honour

Wins by County

Records and statistics

County representatives

Biggest wins
The most one sided Munster finals:
 24 points – 2010: Meelin 5-18 (33) – (9) 0-09 St. Patrick's
 18 points – 2006: Kilworth 4-16 (28) – (10) 1-07 Knockshegowna
 13 points – 2014: Modeligo 5-12 (27) – (14) 0-14 Castlemartyr
 12 points – 2017: Dungourney 1-17 (20) – (8) 0-08 Fenor
 11 points – 2008: Dripsey 2-11 (17) – (6) 1-03 Kilgarvan

Top scorers

All time

By year

Single game

Finals

References

 3